Bahrain was formerly split into twelve regions (mintaqah) that were all administered from the capital city of Manama. On July 3, 2002, these were superseded by the five Governorates of Bahrain (four as of September 2014, with the abolishment of the Central Governorate).

 Al Hadd
 Al Manamah
 Al Mintaqah al Gharbiyah (Western)
 Al Mintaqah al Wusta (Central)
 Al Mintaqah al Shamaliyah (Northern)
 Al Muharraq
 Ar Rifa' wa al Mintaqah al Janubiyah (Rifa and Southern)
 Jidd Haffs
 Madinat Hamad
 Madinat 'Isa
 Juzur Hawar
 Sitrah

The map does not show Madinat Hamad, which was split off from Ar Rifa' wa al Mintaqah al Janubiyah in 1991.

The following map does not show Hamad Town, which was split off from Rifa and Southern Region in 1991.

Bahrain, Municipalities
Subdivisions of Bahrain
History of Bahrain
Bahrain